St. John's School, Marhauli, Varanasi is an English-medium, private school located in the city of Varanasi, India, Established in 1987. The school motto is Vidya Dadati Vinayam. St. John's school teaches moral values as a subject till 12th stage.

History
St. John's School, Marhauli, was established in 1987 under the aegis of the Catholic Diocese of Varanasi. Father Peter is the first principal of the school. In 2001, the school modified its dress policy for senior girls from gray pleated skirts to long grey-checked.

Administration

The school is one of the three schools administered by the Catholic Diocese of Varanasi, the other two being St. John's School, DLW and St. John's School, Ledhupur. It is under the religious jurisdiction of the Bishop of the Diocese of Varanasi and receives active involvement of the Sisters of the Cross of Chavanod in its administration. The school aims at the education of the Catholic community around and extends its services to the members of the other communities.
The school built a new building equal to the old one in 2015; thereafter both the shifts are running parallel.

Curriculum

The school is affiliated to the Council for the Indian School Certificate Examination, New Delhi. It prepares students for the I.C.S.E. (10-year course) and I.S.C. (12-year course). The curriculum includes: English (Language and Literature), Hindi, Sanskrit, History & Civics, Geography, Mathematics, Physics, Chemistry, Biology, Economics, Commerce, Accountancy, Computer Studies and Arts (Drawing).

See also
List of educational institutions in Varanasi

References

External links
 St. John's Marhauli official website

Catholic secondary schools in India
Primary schools in Uttar Pradesh
High schools and secondary schools in Uttar Pradesh
Christian schools in Uttar Pradesh
Schools in Varanasi
Educational institutions established in 1987
1987 establishments in Uttar Pradesh